Hamza al-Jawfi is an Al-Qaeda commander who was killed in Pakistan in June 2010. According to the BBC, al-Jawfi is believed to have operated as Al-Qaeda's external operations chief following the death of Abu Ubaidah al-Masri.

References

Al-Qaeda members
2010 deaths
Year of birth missing